Prusice is a municipality and village in Prague-East District in the Central Bohemian Region of the Czech Republic. It has about 90 inhabitants.

History
The first written mention of Prusice is from 1228.

References

Villages in Prague-East District